The 1921 Akron football team represented the University of Akron in the 1921 college football season as a part of the Ohio Athletic Conference (OAC). The team was led by seventh-year head coach Fred Sefton. Akron outscored their opponents by a total of 117–69 and finished with a 5–3 record.

Schedule

References

Akron
Akron Zips football seasons
Akron football